Antioch Baptist Church can refer to:
 Antioch Baptist Church (Montgomery, Alabama), the first Baptist church in Montgomery
 Antioch Baptist Church (Shreveport, Louisiana), listed on the U.S. National Register of Historic Places (NRHP)
 Antioch Baptist Church (St. Louis, Missouri), also NRHP-listed
 Antioch Baptist Church (Washington, D.C.), in the Northeast section of the city on 50th Street
 Antioch Missionary Baptist Church, Downtown Houston, Texas.